Ernst Haspinger (born 2 July 1955, in Welsberg-Taisten) was an Italian luger who competed during the late 1970s and early 1980s. He won a bronze medal in the men's singles event at the 1981 FIL World Luge Championships in Hammarstrand, Sweden.

Haspinger also won three bronze medals in the men's singles event at the FIL European Luge Championships (1980, 1982, 1984).

He competed in three Winter Olympics, earning his best finish of seventh in the men's doubles event at Innsbruck in 1976.

He won the overall Luge World Cup title in men's singles three times (1979–80, 1980-1 (tied with fellow Italian Paul Hildgartner), 1981-2).

References

External links
Hickok sports information on World champions in luge and skeleton.
List of European luge champions 
List of men's singles luge World Cup champions since 1978.
Wallenchinsky, David. (1984). "Men's Singles Luge" and "Men's Two-seater Luge". In The Complete Book of the Olympics: 1896-1980. New York: Penguin Books. p. 576.

Italian male lugers
Living people
Lugers at the 1976 Winter Olympics
Lugers at the 1980 Winter Olympics
Lugers at the 1984 Winter Olympics
1955 births
Olympic lugers of Italy
People from Welsberg-Taisten
Sportspeople from Südtirol